Coppicegate is a small settlement in Shropshire, England.

External links

Coppicegate at Streetmap.co.uk

Hamlets in Shropshire